Raintree County may refer to:

Raintree County (novel), a 1948 novel by Ross Lockridge, Jr.
Raintree County (film), a 1957 film starring Montgomery Clift and Elizabeth Taylor